The Hindi Belt, also known as the Hindi Heartland, is a linguistic region encompassing parts of northern, central, eastern and western India where various Central Indo-Aryan languages subsumed under the term 'Hindi' (for example, by the Indian census) are spoken. The Hindi belt is sometimes also used to refer to nine Indian states whose official language is Hindi, namely Bihar, Chhattisgarh, Haryana, Jharkhand, Madhya Pradesh, Rajasthan, Uttar Pradesh, Himachal Pradesh, Uttarakhand and the union territory of Chandigarh and the National Capital Territory of Delhi. It is also referred to as the Hindi–Urdu Belt or Hindustani Belt by some writers.

Hindi as a dialect continuum 

Hindi is part of the Indo-Aryan dialect continuum that lies within the cultural Hindi Belt in the northern plains of India. Hindi in this broad sense is a sociolinguistic rather than an ethnic concept.

This definition of Hindi is one of the ones used in the Indian census, and results in more than forty percent of Indians being reported to be speakers of Hindi, though Hindi-area respondents vary as to whether they call their language Hindi or use a local language name to distinguish their language from Hindi. As defined in the 1991 census, Hindi has a broad and a narrow sense.  The name "Hindi" is thus ambiguous. Before being identified as a separate language Maithili was identified as a Hindi dialect. Many such languages still struggle for recognition.

The broad sense covers a number of Central, East-Central, Eastern, and Northern Zone languages, including the Bihari languages except Maithili, all the Rajasthani languages, and the Central Pahari languages. This is an area bounded on the west by Punjabi and Sindhi; on the south by Gujarati, Marathi, and Odia; on the east by Maithili and Bengali; and on the north by Nepali, Kashmiri, Western Pahari and Tibetic languages. The varieties of this belt can be considered separate languages rather than dialects of a single language.

In a narrower sense, Hindi is equated with the Central Zone Indic languages. Based on their linguistic features, these are divided into Western Hindi and Eastern Hindi. The narrowest definition of Hindi is that of the official language, Modern Standard Hindi or Mānak Hindi, a standardised register of Hindustani, one of the varieties of Western Hindi. Standardised Hindustani—including both Mānak Hindi and Urdu—is historically based on the Khariboli of 17th-century Delhi.

Also, in many states like Himachal Pradesh, Hindi is the official language but many oppose the Hindi Belt tag due to the region being part of the Western Pahari linguistic Belt which also includes Jammu areas of the Jammu and Kashmir (princely state) further extending to Pakistan's Pothohar Plateau.

Number of speakers
Population data from 2011 Indian Census is as follows: 
Central zone (Hindi proper)
Western Hindi (West Central zone) 
240 M Hindustani excluding Urdu
9.8 M Haryanvi 
1.5 M Braj Bhasha
9.5 M Kanauji
5.6 M Bundeli 
Eastern Hindi (East Central zone)
4.5 M Awadhi
16.2 M Chhattisgarhi
2.6 M Bagheli
1.7 M Surgujia
Bihari languages apart from Maithili (East Zone)
51 M: Bhojpuri
13 M: Magadhi
8 M: Khortha
5.1 M: Nagpuri
0.5 M: Kurmali
Rajasthani (part of Western Zone, which also includes Gujarati and Bhili) 
7.8 M Marwari-Merwari
5.2 M Malvi
2.3 M Nimadi
4.8M Lambadi
2.9 M Harauti
3 M Godwari
2 M Bagri

According to the 2001 Indian census, 258 million people in India (25% of the population) regarded their native language to be "Hindi", however, including other Hindi dialects this figure becomes 422 million Hindi speakers (41% of the population). These figures do not count 52 million Indians who considered their mother tongue to be "Urdu". The numbers are also not directly comparable to the table above; for example, while independent estimates in 2001 counted 37 million speakers of Awadhi, in the 2001 census only 2½ million of these identified their language as "Awadhi" rather than as "Hindi".

There have been demands to include Awadhi, Bhojpuri, Kumaoni, Bundeli, Chhattisgarhi, Garhwali, Kurmali, Magahi, Nagpuri, and Rajasthani in the Eighth Schedule; these are otherwise regarded as Hindi dialects however these languages don't have any direct relation with modern day Hindi. Some academics oppose inclusion of Hindi dialects in the Eighth Schedule of the Constitution as full-fledged Indian languages. According to them recognition of Hindi dialects as separate languages would deprive Hindi of millions of its speakers and eventually no Hindi will be left.

Outside the Indian subcontinent

Much of the Hindi spoken outside of the subcontinent is distinct from the Indian standard language. Fiji Hindi is a derived form of Awadhi, Bhojpuri, and including some English and very few native Fijian words. It is spoken by majority of Indo-Fijians. Mauritian Bhojpuri, once widely spoken as a mother tongue, has become less commonly spoken over the years. According to the 2011 census, Bhojpuri was spoken by 5% of the population compare.

Geography and demography

The highly fertile, flat, alluvial Gangetic plain occupies the northern portion of the Hindi Heartland, the Vindhyas in Madhya Pradesh demarcate the southern boundary and the hills and dense forests of Jharkhand and Chhattisgarh lie in the east. The region has a predominantly subtropical climate, with cool winters, hot summers and moderate monsoons. The climate does vary with latitude somewhat, with winters getting cooler and rainfall decreasing. It can vary significantly with altitude, especially in Jharkhand and Chhattisgarh.

The Hindi Heartland supports about a third of India's population and occupies about a quarter of its geographical area. The population is concentrated along the fertile Ganges plain in the states of Uttar Pradesh, Madhya Pradesh, Chhattisgarh, Jharkhand and Bihar.

Although the vast majority of the population is rural, significant urban cities include Chandigarh, Panchkula, Delhi, Lucknow, Kanpur, Raipur, Allahabad, Jaipur, Agra, Varanasi, Indore, Bhopal, Patna, Jamshedpur and Ranchi. The region hosts a diverse population, with various dialects of Hindi being spoken along with other Indian languages, and multi-religious population including Hindus, Muslims, Sikhs along with people from various castes and a significant tribal population. The geography is also varied, with the flat, alluvial Gangetic plain occupying the northern portion, the Vindhyas in Madhya Pradesh demarcating the southern boundary and the hills and dense forests of Jharkhand and Chhattisgarh separate the region from West Bengal and Odisha.

Political sphere
Over the years political development in some of these states has been dominated by caste-based politics, but this has changed somewhat in recent years. In 2019 election, 226 members from the Hindi belt states had been elected to the Lok Sabha.

See also 
 BIMARU states

Bibliography
Grierson, G. A. Linguistic Survey of India Vol I-XI, Calcutta, 1928, 
.
.

Notes

References

External links
 On The Problems Of The Hindi Belt: A Seminar
 Bhatele, Abhinav: Introduction To Hindi (Archived 1 June 2012)

Belt regions
Articles containing video clips